Ahmad Khan Moqaddam was the governor of the Iranian town of Maragheh in the early 19th-century. He had been appointed governor during the reign of king (shah) Fath-Ali Shah Qajar, and was the first member of the Moqaddam family to govern the town. His family was supposedly originally tribal leaders from the Caucasus, and had moved to Iran in the late 18th-century. However, by the early 19th-century, the family was a settled people, possessing a great number of villages.

Ahmad Khan also served as the beglarbeg (governor-general) of Tabriz and Khoy. In 1806, he was installed as the khan (governor) of the Erivan Khanate by the shah. However, a year later, he was replaced by Hossein Khan Sardar.

References

Sources 
 
  

Qajar governors
Maragheh

19th-century Iranian people